Rolf Åge Berg (born 14 April 1957) is a Norwegian former ski jumper.

Career
He finished fifth in the individual normal hill event at the 1984 Winter Olympics in Sarajevo. Berg's lone career victory was in an individual normal hill event in St. Moritz in 1986. His career ended after a horrific fall at the Ski Flying World Championships at Kulm in 1986.

World Cup

Standings

Wins

External links

1957 births
Ski jumpers at the 1984 Winter Olympics
Olympic ski jumpers of Norway
Living people
Norwegian male ski jumpers